Sara Errani and Roberta Vinci were the defending champions and successfully defended their title, defeating Ekaterina Makarova and Elena Vesnina in the final, 6–4, 3–6, 7–5.

Seeds

Draw

Finals

Top half

Section 1

Section 2

Bottom half

Section 3

Section 4

External links
 2014 Australian Open – Women's draws and results at the International Tennis Federation

Women's Doubles
Australian Open (tennis) by year – Women's doubles
2014 in Australian women's sport